João Paulo Lima de Oliveira (born 13 July 1981) is a Brazilian professional racing driver currently competing in the Japanese Super GT series. He won the Super GT GT300 class championship in both 2020 and 2022 and the Formula Nippon championship in 2010.

He is regarded as one of the most successful racing drivers to race in Japan in the last decade. JP, as he is known, has won in every category he competed in. After becoming the German F3 champion in 2003 by far, winning 13 out of 16 races, he arrived in Japan in 2004 and took the Japanese F3 title in next year with 7 wins. After that, he joined Nissan as their official factory driver for the next 13 years in Super GT and Super Formula. He is known for his speed and his in-depth ability for car development.

Racing career

Born in São Paulo, de Oliveira competed in kart racing only in 1997, then he moved on to Brazilian national Formula Ford and Formula Chevrolet championships in 1998.

Beginning in 1999, he started competing in Formula Three category. He won the 1999 South American Formula Three (Class B), the 2003 German Formula Three, and the 2005 Japanese Formula Three championships. 

In 2006, de Oliveira debuted in the Super GT with a Hasemi Nissan Z GT500. The Brazilian continued as a Nissan Super GT driver with Kondo (2007-2010, 2017) and Impul (2011-2016). He won two titles, in 2020 and 2022, was runner-up in 2015, and claimed 9 wins and 19 podiums overall.

Also in 2006, he entered the last round of the Formula Nippon with 5Zigen. He also drove in Formula Nippon for Kondo in 2007 and 2008. After skipping 2009, he returned in 2010 with Impul. He won one title in 2020, was runner-up in 2014, and won 10 races and earned 23 podiums in the category. He retired from formula racing after the 2016 season.

de Oliveira made his World Touring Car Championship debut at the 2009 FIA WTCC Race of Japan for SUNRED Engineering. He drove as a wildcard entry in the finale round of the 2019 World Touring Car Cup at Sepang International Circuit in a Honda Civic Type R TCR run by KCMG. He qualified 13th with a time of 2:14.746. In race one, de Oliveira's experience on the track allowed him to finish the race in 5th overall and set the fastest lap of the track, and even assist championship contender Esteban Guerrieri. He dropped to 18th in race two, which was followed by a retirement in race 3 on lap 10 from 25th on the grid. His fifth place is the best position a wildcard driver had in 2019.

Racing record

Career summary

† As de Oliveira was a guest driver, he was ineligible for points. As de Oliveira was a wildcard entry in the WTCR, he was not eligible for points.

‡ Team standings.

Complete Super Formula results
(key) (Races in bold indicate pole position) (Races in italics indicate fastest lap)

Complete Super GT results
(key) (Races in bold indicate pole position) (Races in italics indicate fastest lap)

‡ Half points awarded as less than 75% of race distance was completed.

Complete World Touring Car Championship results
(key) (Races in bold indicate pole position) (Races in italics indicate fastest lap)

American open–wheel racing results
(key)

IndyCar Series

Complete World Touring Car Cup results
(key) (Races in bold indicate pole position) (Races in italics indicate fastest lap)

‡ As de Oliveira was a Wildcard entry, he was ineligible to score points.

References

External links
 Career statistics from Driver Database
 João Paulo de Oliveira on Twitter

Living people
Brazilian racing drivers
1981 births
Formula Nippon drivers
Formula 3 Sudamericana drivers
German Formula Three Championship drivers
British Formula Three Championship drivers
Japanese Formula 3 Championship drivers
Super GT drivers
Brazilian World Touring Car Championship drivers
Brazilian World Touring Car Cup drivers
IndyCar Series drivers
Super Formula drivers
Stock Car Brasil drivers
Racing drivers from São Paulo
Austrian Formula Three Championship drivers
Kolles Racing drivers
Alan Docking Racing drivers
TOM'S drivers
Kondō Racing drivers
KCMG drivers
Nismo drivers
Conquest Racing drivers
Nürburgring 24 Hours drivers